Drimys defensor is an extinct barracudina from Late Miocene-aged marine strata from Southern California.  It was closely related to the extinct genus Holosteus.

References
http://paleodb.org/cgi-bin/bridge.pl?action=checkTaxonInfo&taxon_no=35563&is_real_user=1

Paralepididae
Miocene fish
Miocene fish of North America